Charlestown Village Historic District is a national historic district located in Charlestown Township, Chester County, Pennsylvania.  It is adjacent to the Middle Pickering Rural Historic District.  It encompasses 21 contributing buildings and 1 contributing structure on 7 properties in the crossroads village of Charlestown. They date between about 1740 and 1870, and are reflective of a number of popular architectural styles including Late Victorian and Italianate.  The oldest is the Job Harvey House, built about 1740.  Also included is the Charlestown Woolen Mill (1862-1865), William Nixon House (c. 1817), Charlestown Methodist Episcopal Church (1840, 1881), Moses King House, William Howard house and wheelwright shop, and the "Town Hall."

It was listed on the National Register of Historic Places in 1978.

References

External links
 Job Harvey House, Church Road (Charlestown Township), Charlestown, Chester County, PA: 4 photos, 4 data pages, and 1 photo caption page at Historic American Buildings Survey
 Charlestown Woolen Mill, video, 1:11, Wanda Kaluza, October 5, 2014.

Italianate architecture in Pennsylvania
Historic districts in Chester County, Pennsylvania
Historic districts on the National Register of Historic Places in Pennsylvania
1745 establishments in Pennsylvania
National Register of Historic Places in Chester County, Pennsylvania